Star Fox Adventures is a 2002 action-adventure game developed by Rare and published by Nintendo. The game had a long development cycle starting in 1997. Originally developed as Dinosaur Planet with Rare-created characters as the protagonists, Nintendo producer Shigeru Miyamoto convinced Rare to redesign the game as part of the Star Fox franchise. Its planned release on the Nintendo 64 was cancelled, with development ultimately shifting forward one hardware generation to the GameCube.

The game was released on 23 September 2002 as Rare's only GameCube game and as the final game that Rare developed for a home Nintendo console before being acquired by Microsoft the day after Starfox Adventures released in the US. The game's story takes place eight years after the events of Star Fox 64. Players take control of Fox McCloud, who is sent on a mission to visit a planet in the Lylat System and prevent its destruction.

The game received mostly positive reviews, notably for its detailed graphics, new designs of characters including Fox, and its dynamic environments. However, the voice acting and the departure from the traditional Star Fox-style gameplay received criticism.

Gameplay

The game is played from a third-person perspective with full camera control in most areas and the ability to use a first-person perspective for looking around a location, with the players able to use a widescreen mode, provided that their console is hooked up to a television set that has widescreen capabilities. The game's story focuses on two different styles of gameplay which the player switches between at various points.

The first style of gameplay is Adventure Mode, which is the main mode, and operates in a similar manner to that of The Legend of Zelda series, especially Ocarina of Time. In this mode, players control the game's protagonist as they explore thirteen different locations on foot, each of which unlocks when the player completes a specific task or acquires a new requisite skill, in order to progress the story. Some of the gameplay mechanics are similar in fashion to those in the Zelda games: Adventures has a form of currency called Scarabs, that can be used to purchase healing items, new equipment, and maps of the various locations; the main character's health is divided into hearts consisting of four segments and vaguely resembling fox heads, with the player beginning with three hearts and earning a new one after completing key stages of the story; the character can climb ladders and ledges, swim, and jump between platforms, but cannot freely jump themselves; some areas require the player to solve a puzzle to acquire something or move on; and the game features a day-and-night phase, though this is more gradual than in Zelda games.

The main character comes equipped with a staff after the initial stages of the game, which functions as both a weapon, and a tool for exploration and puzzle-solving. Combat is mainly melee-orientated, with players locking-on to an enemy upon moving in close. Once in combat, an enemy's health is displayed as a heart icon above them, with players able to strafe and roll around a target to dodge attacks, while using the staff to either block incoming strikes, or attack an enemy. As a tool, the staff can be used to open containers, operate mechanisms, or lift up stones to uncover hidden caves and boulders to find items. As the player progress in the story, the staff can be upgraded with powers that can help in combat or assist in solving puzzles and exploring locations, including the ability to fire projectiles at enemies or trigger switches, and a special jump ability to reach places that are inaccessible through normal methods. However, using such powers requires magical energy, which the player can recover by retrieving special crystals from the environment. Along with the staff, the player also has a sidekick that joins them after a certain stage of the story, who can help by finding them items and using certain abilities to open up new areas. Such abilities, referred to as tricks, require the player to feed them with special mushrooms, with each one constituting one trick that can be performed, with the sidekick able to perform a maximum of six tricks when fully fed before needing more mushrooms. The game's inventory system focuses on three areas - collectibles, staff powers, and Tricky abilities - with the player able to use three scanner systems in the game - a mini-map of a region (provided a map has been purchased first), a scanner to give information on objects in that are approached, and a fuel cell radar.

The second style of gameplay is Arwing Mode, and functions in a similar manner to other games in the Star Fox series. In this mode, the player decides where on Dinosaur Planet they wish to go; at the beginning of the game, the planet itself, the game's overworld, is only accessible, but upon unlocking a planet segment during the Adventure Mode, the player gains access to travelling there via Arwing. Upon choosing a destination, the player engages in an on-rail segment, in which players dodge obstacles while shooting down enemies, with the ability to fly through silver rings to recover some health, and being able to use super-bombs to eliminate groups of enemies. In order to visit a place, the player must fly through a set number of gold rings; each segment has around 10 gold rings, and the player will need to fly through more to reach later areas, or be forced to repeat the segment. In addition, the player must also acquire a certain amount of fuel cells during Adventure Mode, before they can use the Arwing to travel somewhere. Once they reached the area once, Fuel Cells are not consumed to travel to the place again.

Plot

Characters and settings

Star Fox Adventures features both the established main characters of the Star Fox series—Fox McCloud, Falco Lombardi, Slippy Toad and Peppy Hare (though Falco is absent for the majority of the game), as well as a host of new characters, including a mysterious blue fox named Krystal and the small dinosaur Prince Tricky. The entire planet is populated with dinosaurs, like the tyrannical General Scales, and other prehistoric animals such as pterosaurs and mammoths.

The entire game takes place on the world of Dinosaur Planet (known as "Sauria" in subsequent games) and a number of detached pieces of the planet that are suspended in orbit around it. Dinosaur Planet is ruled by the EarthWalker tribe, resembling ceratopsians, and the rival CloudRunner tribe, similar to pterosaurs and birds. The SharpClaw tribe are villainous humanoid theropods. Andross also appears as the final boss.

Story
Eight years after Andross' first defeat, Krystal investigates the destruction of her home planet, Cerinia, and the death of her parents. Receiving a distress call from Krazoa Palace, Krystal discovers that it was attacked by General Scales and the SharpClaw army. Krystal is persuaded by a wounded EarthWalker in the Palace to collect the Krazoa Spirits and return them to the palace, which would supposedly tilt the war in the dinosaurs' favour and stop Scales. After releasing the first one, however, a mysterious being sends Krystal into the spirit's path, trapping her in a floating crystal atop the palace until all the spirits can be returned.

Meanwhile, on the edge of the Lylat System, General Pepper contacts the Star Fox Team, asking them to investigate the invasion of the Dinosaur Planet. Since the team are desperate for money and maintenance, team leader Fox McCloud agrees to take a look, arriving unarmed at Pepper's request to avoid trouble with the locals. On the planet's surface, Fox obtains and wields the magic staff which Krystal lost earlier. Fox learns from the Queen of the EarthWalker Tribe that Scales stole four Spellstones from the planet's two Force Point Temples. Resolving to prevent the planet from breaking up further and restore it to its original unity, Fox traverses the planet and retrieves the stones to the temples, with the help of the Queen's son, Prince Tricky. As Fox retrieves the stones, he discovers that he must also retrieve the other five Krazoa Spirits to repair the planet and save Krystal. When Fox finds the last spirit, he discovers that it is guarded by Scales himself. However, just as Fox and Scales engage in combat, a mysterious voice orders Scales to surrender the spirit, to which he reluctantly agrees. Fox takes the spirit to the Krazoa Shrine and frees Krystal.

The spirits are forced into the head of a Krazoa statue, which reveals itself to be the revived Andross, the mastermind behind the spirit scheme, who flies off to resume his conquest of the Lylat System. When Falco Lombardi arrives in space, he helps Fox destroy Andross once again, restoring and repairing the Krazoa spirits to the planet. Afterwards, Falco rejoins the Star Fox team and Krystal is recruited into the team beginning a romance with her and Fox.

Development

Star Fox Adventures began as Dinosaur Planet, a Nintendo 64 game unrelated to the Star Fox series. According to lead engineer Phil Tossell, development of Dinosaur Planet began after the release of Diddy Kong Racing (1997), with two teams to work on Dinosaur Planet and Jet Force Gemini toward the end of the Nintendo 64's lifespan. The game was changed many times during early development before Rare settled on the eventual idea of an open world adventure-game based around two interwoven stories. According to Kevin Bayliss, a lead developer for the game for Rare, Dinosaur Planet was originally to feature Timber, the tiger character from Diddy Kong Racing, as that game was originally planned to be RC Pro-Am 64 and featuring Timber until Nintendo suggested them to work it into the Donkey Kong intellectual property. They set Timber as a time-traveler into a prehistoric world in gameplay similar to The Legend of Zelda: Ocarina of Time. As they developed the game, they found it better to shift the main character to two separate ones, Sabre the wolf and Krystal the fox, forgoing Timber's appearance. Eventually, the plot for Dinosaur Planet concerned Sabre and Krystal, along with sidekicks Tricky and Kyte (who both appear in the finished game), and Randorn, a wizard who was Sabre's father and Krystal's adoptive father (who was dropped entirely). The game featured elements such as the 'SwapStone', which would let the player switch between Krystal and Sabre. Dinosaur Planet was intended to be Rare's last game for the Nintendo 64 and was adorned with gameplay and cinematics introduced by Ocarina of Time. Dinosaur Planet initially utilised the Nintendo 64's Expansion Pak and was housed in a 512-megabit (64 megabyte) cartridge, which is the largest size the console would have.

In the meantime, at Nintendo's headquarters in Kyoto, Nintendo producer Shigeru Miyamoto had requested Star Fox creator Takaya Imamura to work on a Star Fox title that would forgo the series' usual 3D rail shooter gameplay in favor of a ground based action adventure title. Bayliss said that Rare developed Dinosaur Planet in earnest, including preparation of a large E3 2000 demonstration, without considering that Nintendo already had the Star Fox property. Miyamoto mentioned in a retrospective interview that, after reviewing content of Dinosaur Planet, the similarities of Rare's anthropomorphic design of Sabre to Nintendo's Fox McCloud design were striking. Just prior to E3 2000, Nintendo asked Rare to keep discussion of Dinosaur Planet quiet and arranged a meeting with Rare to see about a "marriage" of Dinosaur Planet and Star Fox during the event. The two agreed to the idea of Star Fox Adventures: Dinosaur Planet as a Nintendo 64 game, maintaining as much of Rare's work. Bayliss, Tossel, and Lee Schuneman later met with Nintendo in Japan in the weeks that followed to further discuss how to merge the properties, such as bringing Fox McCloud and the other Star Fox characters into the game, adjusting the art style of the other characters of Dinosaur Planet to match, and developing a story to fit into the Star Fox canon.

The team later realised the potential of using the Star Fox licence in hopes of boosting awareness, and switch development from the Nintendo 64 to the then-upcoming GameCube console as a launch game. Sabre was dropped in favor of Fox McCloud as the lead, but the game retains certain original Dinosaur Planet characters such as Krystal and Tricky.  Rare staff had originally pondered on whether they would retain the character of Krystal for the final game, but Imamura, who had been brought on as a supervisor and producer for the project, convinced the team to keep her and even illustrated her final design, which was much more sexualized and revealing than the original Dinosaur Planet appearance. According to Imamura, he and Miyamoto were looking to add "sex appeal" to the Star Fox franchise, as Miyamoto wanted the series to have mature elements where possible, and that Krystal's new design was inspired by Vampirella, a comic book character known for wearing risqué outfits. The Dinosaur Planet was dropped from the proposed name. Of all games converted away from Nintendo 64 in its late market span, IGN called this possibly the biggest departure, having expected it to be one of the platform's killer apps, and side-by-side comparing its "amazing graphical upgrades" on GameCube.

With the Star Fox theme established, Rare begun re-working the game for the then-upcoming GameCube and was subsequently met with little interference from Nintendo. During development, the team was invited to Nintendo's headquarters in Kyoto to discuss progress and certain changes; in return Imamura came to stay at Rare's Twycross studio to oversee development.  Tossell stated that "without a doubt", Nintendo strengthened their relationship through trust and respect, though Nintendo only had a 49% stake of the company at the time.

David Wise used Peter Siedleczek's Advanced Orchestra library in creating the music for Star Fox Adventures. Wise said the tracks that reference the music for the previous Star Fox games came very late in development, after having converted it into Star Fox Adventures.

In February 2021, a late development version of Dinosaur Planet for the Nintendo 64 dated December 2000 was leaked online, having been acquired from a collector in Sweden. The build features a unique model for Fox instead of Sabre, indicating that Miyamoto's intervention happened before the decision was made to transition the game to GameCube.

Star Fox Adventures is the final Rare game released by Nintendo. Shortly after its release, Microsoft purchased Rare for £375 million, ending most of Rare's association with Nintendo. Rare continued developing games for the Game Boy Advance and Nintendo DS.

Reception

Star Fox Adventures received "generally favorable" reviews, according to video game review aggregator Metacritic. It sold over 200,000 copies in Japan following its release, and was the fastest-selling GameCube game at the time. By July 2006, it had sold 800,000 copies and earned $30 million in the United States. Next Generation ranked it as the 73rd highest-selling game launched for the PlayStation 2, Xbox or GameCube between January 2000 and July 2006 in that country. Combined sales of Star Fox games released during the 2000s reached 1.2 million units in the United States by July 2006. Star Fox Adventures was eventually designated a Player's Choice game by Nintendo, signifying over 250,000 copies sold, and was thus available at a reduced retail price.

The visuals were very well received, particularly for Fox's new design. Edge wrote that the "visual splendour is immense", whilst in a similar fashion Matt Casamassina of IGN noted that the game is a "perfect companion" to The Legend of Zelda series, to which Adventures is often compared. Casamassina noted that elements of its graphical rendering were sophisticated for its time, in particular the advanced real-time rendering of the movement of the characters' fur. NGC Magazine praised the game's vibrant atmosphere and detailed textures. The game's combat system garnered some accolades, with GameSpot adding that the combat is simplistic, though being "good looking" and not frustrating. Casamassina also praised the combat system. NGC Magazine similarly praised the use of the combat system, but they noted that the battles did not require any skill and eventually "felt like a dull chore". The voice acting was viewed negatively, with Casamassina remarking that it is "over the top" in some places. NGC Magazine said that the accents of most of the characters did not suit that of the Star Fox world, in particular they noted the use of a Scottish accent for the Warpstone Master was "awful".

Though mostly positively reviewed, Star Fox Adventures is often criticised for its gameplay and setting being too much of a departure from the other Star Fox games, in favor of the Zelda style gameplay. Casamassina said that "fans expecting a true Star Fox experience akin to the older games are in for a disappointment". He also added that the Star Fox license has been utilised sparingly to the point where the game felt "out of place within the confines of the Star Fox game universe". Casamassina asserted that Fox was "clearly only on 'Dinosaur Planet' at Nintendo's request, not because he belongs". NGC Magazine similarly expressed concern on why Fox was added to the game, adding that Adventures was "one game Fox himself would probably want to forget" and further speculating that Nintendo only added the Star Fox license to prevent Dinosaur Planet from appearing on the Xbox.

GameSpot named Star Fox Adventures the second-best GameCube game of September 2002. It was nominated for GameSpots annual "Best Action Adventure Game", "Best Music", "Best Graphics (Technical)" and "Best Graphics (Artistic)" awards among GameCube games.

References

External links

Star Fox Adventures – Dinosaur Planet – Rareware
Dinosaur Planet – Rareware
Dinosaur Planet – Nintendo

2002 video games
Action-adventure games
Cancelled Nintendo 64 games
Dinosaurs in video games
Planetary romances
GameCube games
GameCube-only games
Open-world video games
Rare (company) games
Adventures
Video games about extraterrestrial life
Video games produced by Shigeru Miyamoto
Video games scored by David Wise
Video games featuring female protagonists
Single-player video games
Video games developed in the United Kingdom